Cornifalx is a monotypic genus of Tasmanian araneomorph spiders in the family Orsolobidae containing the single species, Cornifalx insignis. It was first described by V. V. Hickman in 1979, and is only found in Tasmania.

See also
 List of Orsolobidae species

References

Monotypic Araneomorphae genera
Orsolobidae
Spiders of Australia